Emmanuel Delicata is a Maltese wine producer.

History
Emmanuel Delicata is Malta’s oldest family run winery producing the widest range of Malta grown wines with George Delicata leading the firm. The company was established in 1907.

Production
In the vineyard, Emmanuel Delicata developed and implemented the ‘Vines for Wines’ project in 1994, in a collaborative effort with the farming community to plant more vineyards with international grape varieties. ‘Vines for Wines’ still promotes sustainable practices which are environmentally sound, economically feasible and socially equitable.

References

External links 
 Official Homepage Delicata
 Ministry of Agriculture Portal

Wineries of Malta
Maltese brands
Food and drink companies established in 1907
1907 establishments in Malta